Saturday Night Live Japan was a Japanese late-night live television sketch comedy and variety television program broadcast that aired both on Fuji TV and Fuji TV NEXT. It was adaptation of Saturday Night Live on NBC that relies more on the konto style of comedy.

Format
The show has two main hosts, Koji Imada and Sanma Akashiya, and is aired monthly every first week rather than weekly. The show still contains the same format of having a guest star appear on the show along with a guest singer or band performing at the end.

References

2012 Japanese television series debuts
2012 Japanese television series endings
Japanese-language television shows
Japanese variety television shows
Saturday Night Live
Fuji TV original programming